The Sugarloaf Fire Tower Historic District encompasses a collection of historic buildings located near the summit of Sugarloaf Mountain, a hill 1150 feet in elevation in the Ozark-St. Francis National Forest of northeastern Stone County, Arkansas.  The main structure is a braced metal-frame fire tower, alongside which stand a residence, privy, and vaulted stone storage cellar.  These structures were all built in 1937 by a crew of the Civilian Conservation Corps, and is particularly unusual because the fire watch facility included a residence.

The district was listed on the National Register of Historic Places in 1995.

See also
National Register of Historic Places listings in Stone County, Arkansas

References

Ozark–St. Francis National Forest
Historic districts on the National Register of Historic Places in Arkansas
Fire lookout towers on the National Register of Historic Places
Fire lookout towers in Arkansas
National Register of Historic Places in Stone County, Arkansas
1937 establishments in Arkansas
Civilian Conservation Corps in Arkansas
Rustic architecture in Arkansas